Bagh Narges (also Romanized as Bāgh Narges; also known as Bāgh Nargesān) is a village in Rudkhaneh Bar Rural District, Rudkhaneh District, Rudan County, Hormozgan Province, Iran. At the 2006 census, its population was 280, in 71 families.

References 

Populated places in Rudan County